Neotaracia unimacula is a species of tephritid or fruit flies in the genus Neotaracia of the family Tephritidae.

Distribution
Mexico South to Costa Rica.

References

Tephritinae
Insects described in 1979
Diptera of South America